Thinley Dorji (born 20 November), is an archer who internationally represented Bhutan

Dorji competed for Bhutan at two Summer Olympics, he was part of the first team to compete at the Olympics for Bhutan when he took part in the 1984 Summer Olympics held in Los Angeles, where he finished 53rd, four years later he competed in the 1988 Summer Olympics held in Seoul, he finished 73rd in the individual event and the team finished 22nd in the team event.

References

External links
 

1950 births
Living people
Olympic archers of Bhutan
Archers at the 1984 Summer Olympics
Archers at the 1988 Summer Olympics
Bhutanese male archers
Asian Games competitors for Bhutan